General Francisco Javier Mina International Airport, also known as Tampico International Airport formerly , is an international airport located at Tampico, Tamaulipas, Mexico. It is named after General Francisco Javier Mina, a leader in Mexico's War of Independence. It handles national and international air traffic of the metropolitan area of Tampico, Ciudad Madero and Altamira.

It handled 270,835 passengers in 2020, and 397,191 passengers in 2021.

Airlines and destinations

Statistics

Passengers

Busiest routes

Gallery

See also 

 List of the busiest airports in Mexico

References

External links
 Grupo Aeroportuario Centro Norte de México
 Aeropuerto de Tampico

Airports in Tamaulipas
Airfields of the United States Army Air Forces